Pellaindi Kaani is a Telugu romantic comedy film starring  Allari Naresh, Bhanupriya, Kamalinee Mukerji, Krishna Bhagavaan, Kota Srinivasa Rao and Sunil in the lead roles, directed by E. V. V. Satyanarayana. The film was released in August 2007.

Plot
Pellaindi Kani portrays what happens between two bumps to the head of the protagonist Attchi Babu (Allari Naresh). With the first bump, at the age of 10, he loses his mental balance. Twelve years later he regains his sanity with another bump to his head.

Attchi Babu is the son of a rich widow (Bhanupriya) and is heir to a vast property. His mother loves him dearly. In the hope that he would become normal, she arranges his marriage with Gayathri (Kamalinee Mukherjee), daughter of the village headmaster (Chandra Mohan) who is in need of money to get his heart operated. Bhanupriya knows that no sensible girl would ever wish to marry an abnormal person. Yet for the love of his son she arranges for the marriage. Gayathri agrees to the marriage to save her father. She also hopes that someday Attchi Babu would become normal.

But Bhanupriya's brothers (Kota Srinivasa Rao and Krishna Bhagavaan) are working overtime to finish off both the mother and son to acquire their property. Will they succeed? Will Attchi Babu father a child? Pellaindi Kani has the uninteresting answers.

Cast
 Allari Naresh ... Atchi Babu
 Kamalinee Mukherjee ...  Gayathri
 Bhanupriya ... Rajeshwari
 Krishna Bhagavaan ... Rajeshwari's brother
 Kota Srinivasa Rao ... Rajeshwari's brother
 Sunil ... Subramaniam / Subbu
 Harish Kumar ... Sivaji
 Chandra Mohan ... Gayathri's father
 Pragathi ... Gayathri's mother
 Sudeepa Pinky ... Kota's daughter

References

External links
 

2007 films
2000s Telugu-language films
Films directed by E. V. V. Satyanarayana